Joseph Simon (February 7, 1851February 14, 1935) was a German-born politician and attorney in the U.S. state of Oregon. He was born in Bechtheim, Hesse, and his family immigrated to the United States when he was one year old, settling in Portland, Oregon. A Republican, Simon served on the city council before election to the Oregon State Senate. He was later elected to the United States Senate for one partial term, 1898 to 1903. He later served as mayor of Portland for one term, 1909 to 1911. He was also the first Jewish Republican senator.

Early life
Joseph Simon was born in Bechtheim, today a part of Germany, on February 7, 1851, to David Simon (1819–1901) and Elise née Leopold (1829–1890). He immigrated to the United States in 1852 with his parents, and in 1857 the family settled in Portland, Oregon. In Portland, Simon attended the local Portland Public Schools before studying law. He read law at the Portland law firm owned by Joseph N. Dolph and John H. Mitchell, and passed the bar in 1872. After passing the bar he entered private legal practice at Mitchell and Dolph’s firm. In 1873, he formed a partnership with Dolph and Dolph's brother Cyrus.

Political career
He entered politics as a member of the Portland City Council serving from 1877 to 1880. In 1880, he was elected to and served in the Oregon State Senate as a Republican. Simon represented Multnomah County in several districts during his tenure due to reapportionment, and served through the 1891 legislative session. During both the 1889 and 1891 sessions he served as the President of the Senate. Simon did not serve in the 1893 session, but returned to the state senate in 1895 and was again the President.

During this time he was a member of the Republican National Committee from 1892 to 1896. In 1897, Simon was again President of the Senate; the 19th Oregon Legislative Assembly, however, did not organize for its 1897 regular session (due to a dispute over leadership in the House), and no legislation was passed. Due to this inability, a special legislative session was held in 1898 where Simon served as President, and where he served for the final time in the Oregon Senate.

As the Oregon Legislative Assembly failed to fully organize in 1897, they did not elect a United States senator, and Simon was then elected during the 1898 session, replacing incumbent and former employer John H. Mitchell. Simon served from October 8, 1898, until the term expired on March 3, 1903, and did not seek re-election. While in the Senate, he was chairman of the Committee on Irrigation and Reclamation of Arid Lands during the Fifty-sixth and Fifty-seventh Congresses.

Later years
After serving in Congress, Simon returned to Portland and the practice of law at the firm of Dolph, Mallory, Simon & Gearin. He held political office one final time, serving as Portland Mayor from 1909 to 1911. He was never married. Joseph Simon died on February 14, 1935, at the age of 84 in Portland, and was buried at Beth Israel Cemetery in that city.

See also

List of Jewish members of the United States Congress
List of United States senators born outside the United States

References

External links

 

1851 births
1935 deaths
German emigrants to the United States
American people of German-Jewish descent
Republican Party United States senators from Oregon
Mayors of Portland, Oregon
Presidents of the Oregon State Senate
Republican Party Oregon state senators
Portland City Council members (Oregon)
Jewish United States senators
Jewish mayors of places in the United States
Jews and Judaism in Portland, Oregon
American lawyers admitted to the practice of law by reading law
Jewish American people in Oregon politics